Danbury Fair (also referred to as Danbury Fair Mall) is an upscale shopping mall located in Danbury, Connecticut. As of 2011, it is the second largest shopping mall in Connecticut, as well as the fifth largest in New England. It is located off of Interstate 84 and U.S. Route 7 opposite the Danbury Municipal Airport. The mall currently features the traditional chains Macy's, JCPenney, Primark, and Dick's Sporting Goods.

Overview
There are 192 retailers and eateries, including the major department stores Macy's and JCPenney. Filene's was in the mall until the 2006 Macy's consolidation. The mall is especially popular with kids, partly due to the double decker carousel in the food court and many youth-oriented events and activities the mall sponsors on a regular basis (such as "Family Fun Night"). Many of these events take place in the mall's center on the lower floor.  This space changes throughout the year, and can be converted into a stage area for special events such as song and dance performances. The mall is decorated during the holidays.

Every summer from June to July, a carnival opens, taking up one of the mall's parking areas. The mall refers to the event as the “Danbury City Fair” in a nod to the historic fair upon whose site the mall was built. When the mall changed companies in the mid-2000s, however, the carnival was cut back from a month-long event starting in June to just a two-week event, starting every Memorial Day weekend.

History
The mall was built by the Wilmorite Corporation on land formerly used for the Danbury Fair, which paid $170,000 per acre, at that time the highest price ever paid for land in the Danbury area.

During construction, it emerged that two Wilmorite executives had paid Danbury's then-mayor, James Dyer, $60,000 in cash, sometimes concealed in newspapers. They claimed he demanded the money to assure his support for the mall. The allegations contributed to Dyer's defeat for re-election in 1987. He was acquitted of corruption charges in 1990; other charges were dismissed later. Lawyers for him and other city officials portrayed the executives as willing to do anything to get the mall built.

The mall opened in 1986, anchored by Sears and G. Fox & Co. (which became Filene's in 1993). Macy's opened in October 1987 and JCPenney in March 1988. In 1991, Lord & Taylor and a parking garage were added. In 2005 the Wilmorite Corporation sold the mall to The Macerich Company.

In January 2007, Danbury Fair began the process of an interior renovation, which was completed in spring 2008. The mall received new lighting fixtures which replaced the original globe bulb lighting, new stone style floors which replaced the original tan, brown, and green tile floors, soft seating areas throughout the mall, new stained wood accents, and new paint. The two areas that received the most changes were the food court and the center court. A renovated food court features a slightly curved panoramic view of the restaurant choices, which reduced the number of restaurants from 16 to 11. New banquet seating is featured in the food court. The center court includes the removal of the large scale fountains (which also doubled as event areas), and has been replaced with a Starbucks coffee bar, soft seating with tables, and a down-scaled water feature to reduce the noise level.

By 2010, the Filene's store was reconstructed into mall space which includes Dick's Sporting Goods, Forever 21, Brio Tuscan Grille, The Cheesecake Factory, and L.L.Bean. 

In 2015, Primark opened one of its first American locations at the center. It opened in the upper level of the Sears store, while Sears downsized to a 56,000 sq ft store on the lower level.

The later 2010's saw multiple classic chain anchors update their brick and mortar fleets after being disrupted by digital retailers in recent years.

On November 7, 2019, it was announced that Sears would shutter as part of an ongoing plan to phase out of brick-and-mortar.

On August 27, 2020, Lord & Taylor announced it would shutter its brick-and-mortar fleet after modernizing into a digital collective department store.

Round1 Bowling & Amusement and Target announced new stores in 2022.

List of anchor stores

See also
 Freehold Raceway Mall in Freehold Township, New Jersey - Built by developer Wilmorite a few years after Danbury Fair and also currently owned by Macerich. Due to both malls being built around the same time in the New York metropolitan area, utilizing similar interior design fixtures, along with both malls residing under relatively similar high socioeconomic areas and thus offering similar stores, they are sometimes attributed as retail 'twins'.

References

External links 
 
 The Macerich Company

Shopping malls in Connecticut
Tourist attractions in Danbury, Connecticut
Buildings and structures in Danbury, Connecticut
Macerich
Shopping malls established in 1986
Carousels in Connecticut
1986 establishments in Connecticut
Shopping malls in the New York metropolitan area